Nərimankənd (also, Orconikidze, Narimankend, and Ordzhonikidze) is a village and municipality in the Gadabay Rayon of Azerbaijan.  It has a population of 892.  During the Soviet period, the village was named in honor of Sergo Ordzhonikidze.

References 

Populated places in Gadabay District